Petar Tomasevic (born 2 January 1989) is a former water polo player from France. He was part of the French team at the 2016 Summer Olympics, where the team was eliminated in the group stage. He is married and has a daughter.

References

French male water polo players
Living people
1989 births
Olympic water polo players of France
Water polo players at the 2016 Summer Olympics